Carla Tuzzi (born 2 June 1967 in Frascati) is an Italian former hurdler, who best result at international individual senior level was the 5th place in the final of the 1994 European Indoor Championships with the new national record.

Career
She won 19 national championships and held national record in 100 metres hurdles for 18 years (from 1994 to 2012). Tuzzi competed at three edition of World Championships (1993, 1995, 1997), one of the Olympic Games (1996) and one of the European Championshipos (1994). 

She also won two medals at the Mediterranean Games ten years apart (1987 at 20 and 1997 at 30).

Statistics

National records
60 m hs: 7.97   Paris (from 13 March 1994 to 1 March 2013)
100 m hs: 12.97   Valencia (from 12 June 1994 to 13 May 2012)

Progression
 
100 metres hurdles

60 metres hurdles indoor

Achievements

National titles
Tuzzi won 19 national championships at individual senior level.
Italian Athletics Championships
100 m hs: 1987, 1988, 1989, 1990, 1993, 1994, 1995, 1996, 1997 (9)
Italian Indoor Athletics Championships
60 m hs: 1988, 1989, 1990, 1991, 1993, 1994, 1995, 1996, 1997 (9)
60 m: 1996 (1)

See also
 Italian all-time top lists – 100 m hurdles
 Italy at the 1996 Summer Olympics
 Italy at the 1993 World Championships in Athletics
 Italy at the 1995 World Championships in Athletics
 Italy at the 1997 World Championships in Athletics

References

External links
 

1967 births
Italian female hurdlers
People from Frascati
Living people
Athletes (track and field) at the 1996 Summer Olympics
Olympic athletes of Italy
Mediterranean Games silver medalists for Italy
Mediterranean Games bronze medalists for Italy
Athletes (track and field) at the 1987 Mediterranean Games
Athletes (track and field) at the 1997 Mediterranean Games
World Athletics Championships athletes for Italy
Mediterranean Games medalists in athletics
Sportspeople from the Metropolitan City of Rome Capital